From the Heart: 15 Career Classics is a compilation album by American country duo The Judds. It was released in 1992 by the Curb and RCA Nashville labels. The album was co-produced by Brent Maher, Norman Miller and Paul White. From the Heart was the duo's first album exclusively released for the Canadian market. It contained a total of 15 tracks and reached Canadian record chart positions following its release.

Background, content and chart performance
By 1992, The Judds had already disbanded as a musical duo. In 1990, Naomi Judd revealed a battle with Hepatitis C, which forced her to retire from performing. In 1992, Wynonna Judd embarked on a successful country solo career. Although the duo separated, their record label continued releasing compilations of their previously-recorded material, which included this package. From the Heart: 15 Career Classics contained 15 tracks that had previously been recorded between 1983 and 1989. All of the songs had been issued as singles and been successful in the United States and Canada. From the Heart included the number one singles "Mama He's Crazy," "Grandpa (Tell Me 'Bout the Good Old Days)," "Have Mercy," "I Know Where I'm Going" and "Love Is Alive."

From the Heart was released in 1992 through Curb and RCA Records. It was released exclusively for the Canadian market, their first album to only be distributed there. The album was issued as both a compact disc and a cassette. The album also charted in Canada, reaching the number two positions on the RPM Country Albums chart in 1992. The album also peaked at number 42 on the RPM Top Albums chart, becoming The Judds's only compilation to chart on the Top Albums list. From the Heart also certified gold in sales from Music Canada for selling 50,000 units.

Track listing

Compact disc version

Cassette version

Personnel
All credits are adapted from the liner notes of From the Heart: 15 Career Classics.

Musical and technical personnel
 The Judds – lead vocals, harmony vocals
 Brent Maher – producer
 Norman Miller – compilation executive producer
 Paul White – compilation producer

Chart performance

Certifications

Release history

References

1992 compilation albums
Curb Records compilation albums
The Judds compilation albums
RCA Records compilation albums